The 2019 FIBA Under-19 Basketball World Cup (Greek: Παγκόσμιο Κύπελλο Μπάσκετ FIBA Under-19 2019) was the 14th edition of the FIBA Under-19 Basketball World Cup, the biennial international men's youth basketball championship contested by the U19 national teams of the member associations of FIBA. It was hosted by Heraklion, Greece, from 29 June to 7 July 2019.

The United States won their seventh title after defeating Mali 93–79 in the final.

Venues

Qualified teams

Squads

Preliminary round
The draw for the tournament was held on 20 February 2019 in Heraklion, Greece.

All times are local (UTC+3).

Group A

Group B

Group C

Group D

Knockout stage

Bracket

5–8th place bracket

9–16th place bracket

13–16th place bracket

Round of 16

9–16th place quarterfinals

Quarterfinals

13–16th place semifinals

9–12th place semifinals

5–8th place semifinals

Semifinals

15th place game

13th place game

Eleventh place game

Ninth place game

Seventh place game

Fifth place game

Third place game

Final

Final standings

Statistical leaders

Points

Rebounds

Assists

Blocks

Steals

Awards

References

External links
Official website

2019
FIBA Under-19 World Championship
FIBA Under-19 World Championship
Sport in Heraklion
International youth basketball competitions hosted by Greece
FIBA Under-19 Basketball World Cup
FIBA Under-19 Basketball World Cup